OSLAM syndrome is a rare autosomal dominant hereditary disorder. Its name is an initialism of "osteosarcoma, limb anomalies, and erythroid macrocytosis with megaloblastic marrow syndrome". OSLAM syndrome was recognised and described by Mulvilhill  as a syndrome that increases susceptibility to tumours and is characterised by an impaired regulation of bone and marrow development.

Individuals with OSLAM syndrome have an elevated risk of bone cancer, limb abnormalities, and enlarged red blood cells.

Signs and symptoms
Clinical presentation is consistent with:
 Bone cancer
 Curved fifth fingers (clinodactyly) with brachymesophalangy (shortened phalanges of the toes and/or fingers (digits))
 Absence of one digital ray of the foot (a digit and corresponding metacarpal or metatarsal bone)
 Bilateral radioulnar synostosis
 Enlarged red blood cells
 Dental decay
 Short stature

Diagnosis

Treatment

See also
 Li-Fraumeni syndrome

References

External links 

Osseous and chondromatous neoplasia
Sarcoma
Hereditary cancers
Syndromes